The 2nd Arkansas Cavalry Regiment (Slemons') (1861–1865) was a Confederate Army cavalry regiment during the American Civil War. This regiment was also referred to in the official records as the 4th Arkansas Cavalry Regiment. Another regiment, commanded by Colonel Thomas J. Morgan, was also designated as the 2nd Arkansas Cavalry Regiment. Following Price's Raid in 1864, the survivors of the regiment were reorganized as the 18th Arkansas Cavalry Battalion, which was also referred to as McMurtrey's Arkansas Cavalry Battalion.

Organization 
The 2nd Arkansas Cavalry Regiment was originally organized as the 2nd Arkansas Cavalry Battalion at Memphis, Tennessee, in early April 1862, just after the Battle of Shiloh, from five independent cavalry companies from southern Arkansas:.

Company A — This cavalry company was organized by Captain Alexander Mason at Hampton, Calhoun County, Arkansas, on February 20, 1862. When the Second Arkansas Cavalry Battalion was formed at Memphis, Tennessee, in April 1862, Mason's troop was designated as Company A. Captain Mason resigned on May 12, 1862, and was succeeded by Captain Philip Henry Echols. On May 15, 1862, the Second Arkansas Cavalry Battalion was combined with the Sixth Arkansas Cavalry Battalion to form the Second Arkansas Cavalry Regiment, with the Calhoun County Troop becoming Company H. During the regimental reorganization on August 18, 1862, the company's designation was changed to Company G.
Company B — This cavalry company was organized by Captain Elisha L. McMurtrey at Mount Elba, Bradley County, Arkansas, on February 22, 1862. When the Second Arkansas Cavalry Battalion was formed at Memphis, Tennessee, in April 1862, McMurtrey's troop was designated as Company B. On May 15, 1862, the Second Arkansas Cavalry Battalion was combined with the Sixth Arkansas Cavalry Battalion to form the Second Arkansas Cavalry Regiment, with the Bradley County Troop becoming Company D.
Company C — This cavalry company was organized by Captain William Jones Somervell, at Tulip, Dallas County, Arkansas, on March 1, 1862. When the Second Arkansas Cavalry Battalion was formed at Memphis, Tennessee, in April 1862, Somervell's troop was designated as Company C. On May 15, 1862, the Second Arkansas Cavalry Battalion was combined with the Sixth Arkansas Cavalry Battalion to form the Second Arkansas Cavalry Regiment, with Somervell's troop becoming Company E. During the regimental reorganization on August 18, 1862, the Ashley County Troop, Company F, always an understrength unit that was never able to recruit enough men to maintain a full company, was consolidated into this company.
Company D — This cavalry company was organized by Captain J. N. Paine at Pine Bluff, Jefferson County, Arkansas, on March 1, 1862. When the Second Arkansas Cavalry Battalion was formed at Memphis, Tennessee, in April 1862, Paine's troop was designated as Company D. On May 15, 1862, the Second Arkansas Cavalry Battalion was combined with the Sixth Arkansas Cavalry Battalion to form the Second Arkansas Cavalry Regiment, with the Jefferson County Troop becoming Company G. During the regimental reorganization on August 18, 1862, this company was redesignated as Company F.
Company E—This cavalry company was organized by Captain Obediah B. Tebbs, a veteran of the famous Third Arkansas Infantry Regiment, at Hamburg, Ashley County, Arkansas, on March 24, 1862.  When the Second Arkansas Cavalry Battalion was formed at Memphis, Tennessee, in April 1862, Tebbs' troop was designated as Company E.

Some of these companies appear to have been involved in the Battle of Shiloh as independent units, prior to being assigned to the Second Arkansas Cavalry Battalion, but few details are available.   In a letter from Company D's Lt. Walter Greenfield to his wife on April 11, 1862, from his encampment near Shiloh, Greenfield writes:

Upon the organization of the battalion, Major William D. Barnett, a 36-year-old physician from Bradley County, Arkansas, was assigned as the commanding officer. The only other member of the battalion field and staff who can be identified was Assistant Surgeon Thomas W. Hurley, a 26-year-old physician from Calhoun County, Arkansas. The organization of the battalion was apparently marred by an alleged mutiny. The following report appears in the official record:

It is unclear just what the circumstances of the alleged mutiny were, or how it was resolved, but on May 15, 1862, this battalion was consolidated with the 6th Arkansas Cavalry Battalion (Major Charles W. Phifer) at Corinth, Mississippi, to form the 2nd Arkansas Cavalry Regiment.

On May 15, 1862, the 2nd Arkansas Cavalry Battalion was combined with the 6th Arkansas Cavalry Battalion to form the 2nd Arkansas Cavalry Regiment,  During the regimental reorganization on August 18, 1862, the chronically-understrength Company F (formerly Co. E, Second Battalion) was consolidated into Company E (formerly C, Second Battalion), and Companies G and H were redesignated as Companies F and G, respectively.

The 6th Arkansas Cavalry Battalion (also sometimes known as the 1st, Phifer's, White's and McNeill's Battalion) was organized in August 1861 at Pocahontas, Arkansas, originally composed of four Arkansas companies and two Louisiana companies, which were consolidated about April 20, 1862, into two Arkansas companies and one Louisiana company.
The companies of the former 6th Battalion became Companies A-B-C and the companies of the former 2nd Battalion became Companies D-E-F-G-H of the 2nd Arkansas Cavalry Regiment.

The new regiment was placed under the command of Colonel William F. Slemons. The other field officers were:

Lt. Cols. H.R. Withers and Thomas M. Cochran, and
Majors Thomas J. Reid, Jr., and William J. Somervell.
Thomas Garrison was adjutant.
W. Leeper quartermaster, and
Wat Strong served as commissary.

Company commanders were:

Company A – Captain A.H. Christian.
Company B – "The Drew Light Horse" under the command of Captain Joseph Earle (later H.S. Hudspeth).  This company was originally organized as a volunteer militia company in the 52nd Regiment, Arkansas State Militia, on August 13, 1861.
Company C – Captain Thomas Cochran.
Company D – Captain James Portis (later "Cpt. Watt Green", probably Cpt. Walter Greenfield).
Company E – Captain J.S. Somerville, (later Cpt. William Cooper).
Company F – Captain O.B. Tebbs. This company had served as Company E, Second Arkansas Cavalry Battalion
Company G – Captain E.L. Murtree (later Cpt. C. Stell).
Company H – Captain Phil Echols (later Cpt. James Oliver).
Company I – Captain M.L. Hawkins.

Service 

The 2nd Arkansas Cavalry Regiment, under Colonel William Ferguson Slemons, would establish an impressive record under General Nathan Bedford Forrest.  The unit served in the Army of the West and the Department of Mississippi and East Louisiana, and took an active part in the Battles of Iuka, Corinth, and Hatchie Bridge.

Organization of the Confederate Army of West Tennessee, Major General Earl Vand Dorn Commanding at the Battle of Corinth, listed Slemon's Regiment as assigned to Brigadier General Frank Crawford Armstrong's Cavalry Brigade of Brigadier General Dabney H. Maury's Division of Major General Sterling Price's Corps (Army of the West).
On the retreat from Corinth to Tupelo, Mississippi, the 2nd Arkansas Cavalry served as part of the rear guard of the army, under General John C. Breckinridge. On April 9, 1862, it was transferred from Memphis to a camp near Cornith, Mississippi under difficult conditions.  In a April 11, 1862 letter to his wife, Captain Walter Greenfield writes:

On July 3, 1862, it was ordered with Clayton's 2nd Alabama Cavalry against the Federals at Booneville, MS, who were completely routed. Together with the 2nd Missouri Cavalry, it was ordered under Gen. Frank C. Armstrong to Tennessee, where it met at Middleburg, TN, the Federals under Colonel Leggett and defeated them, killing and wounding large numbers of the Federal force. In late July 1862, the 2nd Arkansas, under Col. Slemons, along with the 2nd Missouri and the 4th Mississippi engaged the escort of Federal cavalry and artillery guarding a train of supplies at Britton's Lane, TN, and after a stubborn fight of three hours captured the train, along with 300 prisoners and two pieces of artillery. The 2nd Arkansas lost 70 men killed or wounded in this engagement. In the campaigns of Price and Pemberton in early 1863 defending the approaches to Vicksburg, the 2nd Arkansas was in continuous active service, opposing Federal thrusts at Iuka, Colliersville, Salem, the Yazoo Pass, at Charleston, Austin, and near Commerce, Mississippi and along the Coldwater River. Under the command of Major General Nathan Bedford Forrest in late 1863, it participated in the masterly movements of that greatest of cavalry commanders, encircling armies, taking cities, capturing trains, and burning bridges.

Transferred to the Trans-Mississippi

By late 1863, the 2nd Arkansas Cavalry had been greatly reduced by casualties and absenteeism. On August 4, 1863, Colonel Slemon's wrote to his wife regarding the condition on his command saying,

nearly half of my men are sick now and the prospect very [?] that the other half will run off soon they some where caught the infection from the people here Col Withers has tendered his resignation says he cant soldier on this side the River [think] he is whiped [sic] he puts it upon the grounds of his family. I have not heard from my application to transfer my command across the river.

On August 11, Slemons again wrote about his men gradually slipping back west of the Mississippi River,

Col Withers has gone home again I hope he will stay this time has tendered his resignation he is worth nothing to the service with me some of my men have run off it is reported that he told them if they would report over time it would be all right I have 20 men in pursuit of them hope to catch them before they get over the river.

On August 13 Slemons wrote:

pretty often now my men are crossing the river very Rapidly I fear Brother Withers has acted badly the men charge him [?] but say nothing of this to any one It may be doing him injustice but he is certainly very [trifling].... If my men keep running away they will soon all be gone the weather is exceedingly warm and many of the men are sick Jackson and Tillman are both sick also Garison has been and still sick in the country Bilious fever he has authority to go home and rase [sic] a company will start as soon as he is able to travel The President has issued his proclamation pardoning all deserters who return to units in 20 days after his order is published in This State also returning all who are in prison convicted of Desertion this county full of them doing all kind of Devilment.

An again on August 25, 1863, Colonel Slemons wrote,

My Reg [sic] is well nigh broken up I suppose Withers is the cause of it from what I can hear It is possible that I will get a transfer for the [?] of my Reg [sic] though Gnl [sic] Lee offers me any commd [sic] I may desire on this side.

On September 4, 1862, Col Slemons wrote "I shall send some officers over in a few days to gather up my Deserters may possibly come myself."

It appears that the officers that Colonel Slemons sent west of the Mississippi River were successful in reassembling parts of the regiment, but they did not rejoin Colonel Slemons on the east side of the river.  This led to the existence of one group known as McMurtrey's Arkansas Cavalry Battalion, commanded by Captain E. L. McMurtrey of the 2nd Arkansas, and a second group known as the 2nd Arkansas Cavalry Regiment, under the command of Captain O B. Tebbs, operating in the Confederate Department of the Trans-Mississippi before the regiment was officially transferred to that Department from the Department of Mississippi and East Louisiana.

And December 9, 1863:
 

On October 18, 1863, General Orders No. 86, Headquarters Cavalry in Northern Mississippi listed Colonel Slemons in command of a brigade consisting of the 2nd Arkansas Cavalry, 3rd Regiment Mississippi State Cavalry, 7th Regiment Tennessee Cavalry, Colonel George's Cavalry Regiment and McLendon's Battery of 6 pounders.

Colonel Slemons was still requesting a return to Arkansas from Alabama in March 1864: 3/5/64 Demopolis-Col Slemons asks that himself and certain officers be allowed to proceed to the Trans Miss to gather up absentees-appd Gen Polk

Camden Expedition

While Colonel Slemons himself was still east of the Mississippi River, members of the 2nd Arkansas Cavalry who had reformed west of the river fought in Cabell's, Gano's, and Dockery's brigades in the Camden Expedition including the battles of Mount Elba, Poison Spring, Marks' Mills, and Jenkins' Ferry.

Price's Missouri Raid

The first official mention of Colonel Slemons transfer to the Trans Mississippi is by the Union Colonel Clayton in June 1864:

During the Summer of 1864, the now reconsolidated regiment was recruited up to strength with ten companies.  One of these companies, the Ashley Rangers, was an Arkansas Company which had spent most of the war attached to a Louisiana unit.

The regiment then served with Price's Army on the raid to the Missouri River in September and October 1864, and engaged in the battles of Pilot Knob, Independence, West Point, and Marais des Cygnes, in Kansas. During the Battle of Marais des Cygnes, in Kansas. Colonel Slemons' horse was killed and fell with him, the saddle catching the colonel's leg under him so that he could nor disengage himself. Col Slemons, a number of his officers, 100 of his men, and two artillery pieces were captured and sent as prisoners of war to Johnson Island, later to Rock Island, where they were imprisoned until after the end of the war.

11/10/64 (Camp No. 67).—Order for Cabell's and Slemons' Bgdes approved. Slemons' command, under Col Crawford, furloughed to 12/10, to rendezvous at Miller's Bluff. Cabell's Bgde, under Lt-Col Reiff, to rendezvous 12/10 at Spring Hill, Ark.

A remnant of Slemon's Bgde under Crawford of probably 300 and probably that number of Cabell's under Monroe reported for duty at Champagnolle during Jan 1865. The remainder of the regiment was reduced to battalion size and reorganized and renamed as the 18th Arkansas Cavalry Battalion, which was also referred to as McMurtrey's Arkansas Cavalry Battalion, under the command of Lieutenant Colonel Elisha Lawley McMurtrey.

On March 8, 1865, Union scouts reported that Slemons' Brigade was in south Arkansas watching the Washita (Ouachita) River.

Campaign Credit
Iuka-Corinth Campaign

Battle of Iuka

Battle of Corinth
Battle of Hatchie's Bridge

Red River Campaign, Arkansas Mar-May, 1864.

Battle of Mount Elba, Arkansas, March 29, 1864.

Battle of Poison Spring, Arkansas, April 18, 1864.
Battle of Marks' Mills, Arkansas, April 25, 1864.
Battle of Jenkins Ferry, Arkansas April 30, 1864.
Price's Missouri Raid, Arkansas-Missouri-Kansas, September–October, 1864.
Battle of Fort Davidson, Missouri, September 27, 1864.
Fourth Battle of Boonville, Missouri, October 11, 1864.
Battle of Glasgow, Missouri, October 15, 1864.
Battle of Sedalia, Missouri, October 15, 1864.
Second Battle of Lexington, Missouri, October 19, 1864.
Battle of Little Blue River, Missouri, October 21, 1864.
Second Battle of Independence, Missouri, October 21–22, 1864.
Battle of Byram's Ford, Missouri, October 22–23, 1864.
Battle of Westport, Missouri, October 23, 1864.
Battle of Marais des Cygnes, Linn County, Kansas, October 25, 1864.
Battle of Mine Creek, Missouri, October 25, 1864.
Battle of Marmiton River, Missouri, October 25, 1864.
Second Battle of Newtonia, Missouri, October 28, 1864.

Surrender 
This regiment surrendered with the Army of the Northern Sub District of Arkansas in April 1865.  However in an obituary http://www.argenweb.net/jefferson/history/pioneer-families/greenfield-captain-walter.html indicate a surrender in Pine Bluff Arkansas of some soldiers in June 1865.

See also 

List of Arkansas Civil War Confederate units
List of American Civil War regiments by state
Confederate units by state
Arkansas in the American Civil War
Arkansas Militia in the Civil War

References

External links 
Edward G. Gerdes Civil War Home Page
The Encyclopedia of Arkansas History and Culture
The War of the Rebellion: a Compilation of the Official Records of the Union and Confederate Armies
The Arkansas History Commission, State Archives, Civil War in Arkansas

Units and formations of the Confederate States Army from Arkansas
1865 disestablishments in Arkansas
Military units and formations disestablished in 1865
Military units and formations in Arkansas
Military in Arkansas
1861 establishments in Arkansas
Military units and formations established in 1861